Rahman Bilici (born October 28, 1989) is a Turkish sport wrestler in the 60 kg division of the Greco-Roman style.

He was born in Aşkale, Erzurum Province. He began wrestling in the Erzurum Telekom Sports Club, and was admitted in 2000 to the Wrestling Training Center in Yozgat. The successful athlete transferred later to Kayseri Şekerspor. After the closure of the club, he continued to train at the Pansu Sports Club in Kayseri.

Rahman Bilici is the winner of several medals in cadet and junior class at European and World level. He won the gold medal at the World Junior Wrestling Championships in 2007 held in Beijing, China and in 2008 Istanbul, Turkey. He became the silver medalist at the 2009 World Junior Wrestling Championships held in Ankara.

He participated at the 2012 Summer Olympics, where he reached the third round.

References

External links
 

1989 births
Living people
People from Aşkale
Olympic wrestlers of Turkey
Wrestlers at the 2012 Summer Olympics
Turkish male sport wrestlers
World Wrestling Championships medalists
20th-century Turkish people
21st-century Turkish people